Romina Cifuentes (born 8 February 1999) is an Ecuadorian sprinter. She competed in the women's 4 × 100 metres relay at the 2017 World Championships in Athletics.

References

External links
 

1999 births
Living people
Ecuadorian female sprinters
World Athletics Championships athletes for Ecuador
Place of birth missing (living people)
21st-century Ecuadorian women